A space command is a military organization with responsibility for space operations and warfare (the article also lists organizations known as Space Command).

Space Command may also refer to:

 Space Command (TV series), a 1950s Canadian television programme
 Space Command, a 1979 arcade game from Irem
 Zenith Space Command, an early television remote control by Zenith Electronics
United Nations Space Command, a fictional faction in the Halo video game
 Space Command, a prospective series of films by Marc Scott Zicree

See also
 
 Space Corps (disambiguation)
 Space Force (disambiguation)